Brendan Carroll may refer to:

 Brendan Carroll (footballer) (died 2007), Irish football player
 Brendan Carroll (hurler) (born 1970), Irish retired hurler

See also
 Brendan O'Carroll (born 1955), Irish writer, comedian, actor and director